Aaron is a primarily Jewish surname which is derived from the given name Aaron (given name). There are several surname variants including Aarons, Aaronson, and Aron. Not all occurrences of the surname are Jewish.

Surname 
 Abe Aaron (1910–1970), Canadian jazz musician
 Arthur Louis Aaron (1922–1943), English World War II Victoria Cross recipient
 Barney Aaron (1836–1907), American boxer
 Benjamin Aaron (1915–2007), American attorney, labor law scholar, and civil servant
 Caroline Aaron (born 1952), American actress
 Charles Dettie Aaron (1866–1951), American gastroenterologist
 Daniel Aaron (academic) (1912–2016), American writer and academic
 David L. Aaron (born 1938), American government official
 Hank Aaron (1934–2021), American baseball player
 Harold Robert Aaron (1921–1980), American army general
 Jacob B. Aaron (died 1855), Russian rabbi and author
 John Aaron (born 1948), American engineer
 Lee Aaron (born 1962), Canadian singer
 Manuel Aaron (born 1935), Indian chess player
 Max Aaron (born 1992), American figure skater
 Richard Ithamar Aaron (1901–1987), Welsh philosopher
 Sam Aaron (1911–1996), American wine merchant and writer
 Soazig Aaron (born 1949), French writer
 Teodor Aaron (1803–1867), Romanian clergyman
 Tommie Aaron (1939–1984), American baseball player
 Tommy Aaron (born 1937), American golfer
 Varun Aaron (born 1989), Indian cricketer
 Vasile Aaron (1770–1822), Romanian poet
 Victor Aaron (1956–1996), American actor
 Quinton Aaron (born 1984), American actor

See also 
 Aarons (surname)
 Arron, given name and surname
 Aron (name)
 Aaronson, surname

References 

Jewish surnames
English-language surnames
Romanian-language surnames